In linguistics and etymology, suppletion is traditionally understood as the use of one word as the inflected form of another word when the two words are not cognate. For those learning a language, suppletive forms will be seen as "irregular" or even "highly irregular".

The term "suppletion" implies that a gap in the paradigm was filled by a form "supplied" by a different paradigm. Instances of suppletion are overwhelmingly restricted to the most commonly used lexical items in a language.

Irregularity and suppletion

An irregular paradigm is one in which the derived forms of a word cannot be deduced by simple rules from the base form. For example, someone who knows only a little English can deduce that the plural of girl is girls but cannot deduce that the plural of man is men. Language learners are often most aware of irregular verbs, but any part of speech with inflections can be irregular.

For most synchronic purposes—first-language acquisition studies, psycholinguistics, language-teaching theory—it suffices to note that these forms are irregular. However, historical linguistics seeks to explain how they came to be so and distinguishes different kinds of irregularity according to their origins.

Most irregular paradigms (like man:men) can be explained by phonological developments that affected one form of a word but not another (in this case, Germanic umlaut). In such cases, the historical antecedents of the current forms once constituted a regular paradigm.

Historical linguistics uses the term "suppletion"
to distinguish irregularities like person:people or cow:cattle that cannot be so explained because the parts of the paradigm have not evolved out of a single form.

Hermann Osthoff coined the term "suppletion" in German in an 1899 study of the phenomenon in Indo-European languages.

Suppletion exists in many languages around the world. These  languages are from various language families : Indo-Aryan,  Dravidian, Arabic, Romance, etc.

For example, in Georgian, the paradigm for the verb "to come" is composed of four different roots (and ).

Some of the more archaic Indo-European languages are particularly known for suppletion. Ancient Greek, for example, has some twenty verbs with suppletive paradigms, many with three separate roots. (See .)

Example words

To go 
In English, the past tense of the verb go is went, which comes from the past tense of the verb wend, archaic in this sense. (The modern past tense of wend is wended.) See Go (verb).

The Romance languages have a variety of suppletive forms in conjugating the verb "to go", as these first-person singular forms illustrate (second-person singular forms in imperative):

The sources of these forms, numbered in the table, are six different Latin verbs:
 ‘to go, proceed’,
 ‘to go’
 ‘to go around’, also the source for Spanish and Portuguese  ‘to walk’
 ‘to walk’, or perhaps another Latin root, a Celtic root, or a Germanic root  or 
 suppletive perfective of  ‘to be’.
 ‘to go along’.

Sometimes, the conjugations differ between dialects. In Romansh, Rumantsch Grischun substitutes present and subjunctive forms of ir with vom and giaja (both are from Latin vādere and īre, respectively) in the place of mon and mondi in Sursilvan.

Similarly, the Welsh verb  ‘to go’ has a variety of suppletive forms such as  ‘I shall go’ and  ‘we went’. Irish  ‘to go’ also has suppletive forms:  ‘going’ and  ‘will go’.

In Estonian, the inflected forms of the verb  ‘to go’ were originally those of a verb cognate with the Finnish  ‘to leave’, except for the passive and infinitive.

Good and bad 
In Germanic, Romance (except Romanian), Celtic, Slavic (except Bulgarian and Macedonian), and Indo-Iranian languages, the comparative and superlative of the adjective "good" is suppletive; in many of these languages the adjective "bad" is also suppletive.

The comparison of "good" is also suppletive in  →   →  and  →  → .

Similarly to the Italian noted above, the English adverb form of "good" is the unrelated word "well", from Old English , cognate to  "to wish".

Great and small 
Celtic languages:

{| class="wikitable"
|-
|+ small, smaller, smallest
! Language !! Adjective !! Comparative / superlative
|-
! Irish
| beag (Old Irish bec < Proto-Celtic *bikkos) || níos lú / is lú (< Old Irish laigiu < Proto-Celtic *lagyūs < PIE *h₁lengʷʰ- ("lightweight"))
|-
! Welsh
| bach (< Brythonic *bɨx < Proto-Celtic *bikkos) || llai / lleiaf (< PIE *h₁lengʷʰ- (“lightweight”))
|}
{| class="wikitable"
|-
|+ great, greater, greatest
! Language !! Adjective !! Comparative / superlative
|-
! Irish
| mór (< Proto-Celtic *māros < PIE *moh₁ros) || níos mó / is mó< Proto-Celtic *māyos < PIE *meh₁-)
|-
! Welsh
| mawr (< Proto-Celtic *māros < PIE *moh₁ros) || mwy / mwyaf < Proto-Celtic *māyos < PIE *meh₁-)
|}

In many Slavic languages, great and small are suppletive:
{| class="wikitable"
|-
|+ small, smaller, smallest
! Language !! Adjective !! Comparative / superlative
|-
! Polish
| mały || mniejszy / najmniejszy
|-
! Czech
| malý || menší / nejmenší
|-
! Slovak
| malý || menší / najmenší
|-
! Slovene
| majhen || manjši / najmanjši
|-
! Ukrainian
| малий, маленький|| менший / найменший
|-
! Russian
| маленький (malen'kiy) || меньший / наименьший (men'she / naimen'shiy)
|}
{| class="wikitable"
|-
|+ great, greater, greatest
! Language !! Adjective !! Comparative / superlative
|-
! Polish
| duży || większy / największy
|-
! Czech
| velký || větší / největší
|-
! Slovak
| veľký || väčší / najväčší
|-
! Slovene
| velik || večji / največji
|-
! Ukrainian
| великий || більший / найбільший
|}

Examples in languages

Albanian 
In Albanian there are 14 irregular verbs divided into suppletive and non-suppletive:
{| class="wikitable"
|-
! Verb 
!Meaning!! Present !! Preterite  !! Imperfect 
|-
! !!to be
|   ||   ||  
|-
! !!to have
|  ||  || 
|-
! !!to eat
|   ||   ||  
|-
! !!to come
|   ||   ||  
|-
! !!to give
|   ||   ||  
|-
! !!to see
|   ||   ||  
|-
! !!to fall, strike
|  ||  || 
|-
! !!to bring
|  ||  || 
|-
! !! to stay
|  ||  || 
|}

Ancient Greek 
Ancient Greek had a large number of suppletive verbs. A few examples, listed by principal parts:
erkhomai, eîmi/eleusomai, ēlthon, elēlutha, —, — "go, come".
legō, eraō (erô) / leksō, eipon / eleksa, eirēka, eirēmai / lelegmai, elekhthēn / errhēthēn "say, speak".
horaō, opsomai, eidon, heorāka / heōrāka, heōrāmai / ōmmai, ōphthēn "see".
pherō, oisō, ēnegka / ēnegkon, enēnokha, enēnegmai, ēnekhthēn "carry".
pōleō, apodōsomai, apedomēn, peprāka, peprāmai, eprāthēn "sell".

Bulgarian 
In Bulgarian, the word  ("man", "human being") is suppletive. The strict plural form, is used only in Biblical context. In modern usage it has been replaced by the Greek loan . The counter form (the special form for masculine nouns, used after numerals) is suppletive as well:  (with the accent on the first syllable). For example,  ("two, three people"); this form has no singular either. (A related but different noun is the plural , singular  ("soul"), both with accent on the last syllable.)

English 
In English, the complicated irregular verb to be has forms from several different roots:
be, been, being—from Old English bēon ("to be, become"), from Proto-Germanic *beuną ("to be, exist, come to be, become"), from Proto-Indo-European *bʰúHt (“to grow, become, come into being, appear”), from the root *bʰuH- ("to become, grow, appear").
am, is, are—from Middle English am, em, is, aren, from Old English eam, eom, is, earun, earon, from Proto-Germanic *immi, *izmi, *isti, *arun, all forms of the verb *wesaną ("to be; dwell"), from Proto-Indo-European *h₁ésmi ("I am, I exist"), from the root *h₁es- ("to be").
was, were—from Old English wæs, wǣre, from Proto-Germanic *was, *wēz, from the Proto-Indo-European root *h₂wes- ("to dwell, reside")

This verb is suppletive in most Indo-European languages, as well as in some non-Indo-European languages such as Finnish.

An incomplete suppletion exists in English with the plural of person (from the Latin ). The regular plural persons occurs mainly in legalistic use. More commonly, the singular of the unrelated noun people (from Latin ) is used as the plural; for example, "two people were living on a one-person salary" (note the plural verb). In its original sense of "populace, ethnic group", people is itself a singular noun with regular plural peoples.

Irish

Several irregular Irish verbs are suppletive:

 abair (to say): derived from Old Irish as·beir, from Proto-Indo-European roots *h₁eǵʰs- ("out") and *bʰer- ("bear, carry"). However, the verbal noun rá is derived from Old Irish rád, ultimately from Proto-Indo-European *reh₂dʰ- ("perform successfully").
 bí (to be): derived from Proto-Indo-European *bʰuH- ("grow, become, come into being, appear"). However, the present tense form tá is derived from Old Irish at·tá, from Proto-Celtic *ad-tāyeti, ultimately from Proto-Indo-European *steh₂- ("stand").
 beir (to catch): derived from Proto-Indo-European *bʰer- ("bear, carry"). However, the past tense form rug is derived from Old Irish rouic, which is from Proto-Celtic *ɸro-ōnkeyo-, ultimately from Proto-Indo-European roots *pro- ("forth, forward") and *h₂neḱ- ("reach").
 feic (to see): derived from Old Irish aicci, from Proto-Indo-European *kʷey- ("observe"). However, the past tense form chonaic is derived from Old Irish  ad·condairc, ultimately from Proto-Indo-European *derḱ₂- ("see").
 téigh (to go): derived from Old Irish téit, from Proto-Indo-European *stéygʰeti- ("to be walking, to be climbing"). However, the future form rachaidh is derived from Old Irish regae, ultimately from Proto-Indo-European *h₁r̥gʰ- ("go, move"), while the verbal noun dul is from *h₁ludʰét ("arrive").

There are several suppletive comparative and superlative forms in Irish; in addition to the ones listed above, there is:
fada, "long";  comparative níos faide or níos sia — fada is from Old Irish fota, from Proto-Indo-European *wasdʰos (“long, wide”); compare Latin vāstus (“wide”), while sia is from Old Irish sír ("long, long-lasting"), from Proto-Celtic *sīros (“long”); compare Welsh/Breton hir.

Latin 
Latin has several suppletive verbs. A few examples, listed by principal parts:
sum, esse, fuī, futūrus - "be".
ferō, ferre, tulī or tetulī, lātus - "carry, bear".
fīō, fierī, factus sum (suppletive and semi-deponent) - "become, be made, happen"

Polish 
In some Slavic languages, a few verbs have imperfective and perfective forms arising from different roots. For example, in Polish:

Romanian 
The Romanian verb  ("to be") is suppletive and irregular, with the infinitive coming from Latin fieri, but conjugated forms from forms of already suppletive Latin sum.

Russian 
In Russian, the word  ("man, human being") is suppletive. The strict plural form, is used only in Orthodox Church contexts, with numerals (e. g. "five people") and in humorous context. It may have originally been the unattested . This suppletion also exists in Polish ( > ), Czech ( > ), Serbo-Croatian ( > ), Slovene ( > ), and Macedonian ( > ).

Generalizations 
Strictly speaking, suppletion occurs when different inflections of a lexeme (i.e., with the same lexical category) have etymologically unrelated stems. The term is also used in looser senses, albeit less formally.

Semantic relations 
The term "suppletion" is also used in the looser sense when there is a semantic link between words but not an etymological one; unlike the strict inflectional sense, these may be in different lexical categories, such as noun/verb.

English noun/adjective pairs such as father/paternal or cow/bovine are also referred to as collateral adjectives. In this sense of the term, father/fatherly is non-suppletive. Fatherly is derived from father, while father/paternal is suppletive. Likewise cow/cowish is non-suppletive, while cow/bovine is suppletive.

In these cases, father/pater- and cow/bov- are cognate via Proto-Indo-European, but 'paternal' and 'bovine' are borrowings into English (via Old French and Latin). The pairs are distantly etymologically related, but the words are not from a single Modern English stem.

Weak suppletion 
The term "weak suppletion" is sometimes used in contemporary synchronic morphology in reference to sets of stems whose alternations cannot be accounted for by synchronically productive phonological rules. For example, the two forms child/children are etymologically from the same source, but the alternation does not reflect any regular morphological process in modern English: this makes the pair appear to be suppletive, even though the forms go back to the same root.

In that understanding, English has abundant examples of weak suppletion in its verbal inflection: e.g. bring/brought, take/took, see/saw, etc. Even though the forms are etymologically related in each pair, no productive morphological rule can derive one form from the other in synchrony. Alternations just have to be learned by speakers — in much the same way as truly suppletive pairs such as go/went.

Such cases, which were traditionally simply labelled "irregular", are sometimes described with the term "weak suppletion", so as to restrict the term "suppletion" to etymologically unrelated stems.

See also
 Collateral adjective—denominal adjectives based on a suppletive root, such as arm ~ brachial
 Irregular verb

References

External links

Surrey Suppletion Database – examples of suppletion in different languages

Grammar
Linguistic morphology